Sipi Falls is a series of three waterfalls found at the foothills of Mountain Elgon just at the edge of Mount Elgon National Park near the Kenyan border. They are considered a tourist attraction by the locals, accounting for 10-20% of all tourists visiting Uganda every year. Even so, the government has chronically under-invested in the area. The falls are surrounded by caves and hiking trails.

Location 
The falls are located 2 miles northeast of the town of Sipi and 170 miles from the capital Kampala. The falls are formed by the Sipi River, flowing from the upper slopes of Mount Elgon and terminate in the Kyoga Basin.

Name Origin 
The name Sipi probably derives from the local word sep, a name for a wild banana-like indigenous plant that grows along the banks of the river. The plant has a translucent, green frond with a bolt of crimson rib that resembles a wild banana.

Economy 
Tourism and agriculture are the main sources of income. Common crops include coffee, maize, beans, sweet potatoes, and bananas.

References

Waterfalls of Uganda
Kapchorwa District